Sary-Aka's embassy was a mission from the commander of the Blue Horde Mamai sent to the Russian Eastern border province of Nizhny Novgorod in 1374 to undermine the influence of the Prince of Moscow in his struggle for supremacy among the Russian provinces due to his open opposition to Mongol authority in Russia. The embassy was ambushed and the survivors were imprisoned in the wooden fort of Nizhny Novgorod until the 31st of March 1375 when Sary-Aka with the rest of Tatars were massacred by Russians.

Background 

Sary-Aka's embassy was dispatched by Mamai, a military commander of the Blue Horde, which ruled over lands in what is now the Southern Ukrainian Steppes and the Crimean Peninsula, to Nizhny Novgorod in 1374.
The ambassador was accompanied by a military troop that constituted one thousand of men-at-arms.
The same year the detachment was assaulted by the Russian troops to the south of Nizhny Novgorod with most of its members killed.
The survivors were captured and imprisoned in the Nizhny Novgorod Kremlin along with the ambassador himself, although they were allowed to stay together and keep their weapon with them.
In March 1375 a congress of Russian princes took place in Pereslavl-Zalessky town in Yaroslavl Oblast. It was moderated by the Prince of Moscow and Grand Prince of Vladimir Dmitry Ivanovich Donskoy.
Among the others the congress was attended by warlords of the Principality of Ryazan, Oleg Ivanovich, and of Nizhny Novgorod and Suzdal, Dmitri Konstantinovich of Suzdal.
The Grand Prince of Tver Mikhail II did not attend.

During the congress the decision was taken for a consolidated effort of the Russian warlords against the dominance of Mamai.
To secure the safety of the meeting the eldest son of Dmitri Konstantinovich of Suzdal, Vasiliy Kirdyapa, was ordered to dispatch an armed force to Nizhny Novgorod to take the surviving members of  Sary-Aka's embassy and disarm them on the 31st of March 1375.

The massacre of the embassy 
Sary-Aka either anticipated the threat or was warned in advance so he ordered the captured Tatar battlers to break out of the prison located next to the Dmitrovskaya Tower and occupy the courtyard of the local bishop nearby.
After the Tatars assumed a defensive position they injured and killed many local denizens with their bows and also took Dionysius, the bishop of Suzdal as a hostage.
Some contemporary sources claim Sary-Aka shot an arrow into the bishop that failed to hit him but barely scratched the gown.
Being enraged with the assault on the bishop, local citizens along with the garrison sieged the courtyard and eventually massacred all the Tatars.

The outcome 

The purpose of the embassy is quite vague as no details for the preceding events could be found.
It could either be a permanent mission from the Golden Horde in Nizhny Novgorod, akin to the one located in Moscow, or indeed Sary-Aka was dispatched to Dmitri Konstantinovich of Suzdal to heighten his strife against the Prince of Moscow who recently forced him to cease any claims for the crown of the city of Vladimir.

It is also unclear who issued an order for the massacre since neither Dmitry Ivanovich Donskoy, nor Dmitri Konstantinovich of Suzdal did it. Apart from the latter's son some later sources mention Alexius, Metropolitan of Moscow who forced his subordinate Dionysius to initiate the killing in an attempt to spark Mamai's revenge and therefore consolidate the Russian warlords.

Whatever the actual reason was, all the Russian principalities submitted to the Prince of Moscow, including Ryazan and Nizhny Novgorod, although Tver continued its struggle for the supremacy.

Aftermath 
The reaction from Mamai was delayed due to internal power struggle within the Golden Horde, so only in 1377 he dispatched Blue Horde Khan Arab-Shah Muzaffar to pillage Russian eastern border principalities of Nizhny Novgorod and Ryazan.
On the 2nd of August 1377 the Russian troops were caught unawares and completely exterminated during the battle on Pyana River.
The Tatars were then able to reach Niznhy Novgorod, prompting the evacuation of residents by boats, while Dmitry of Suzdal evacuated to Suzdal.
The town itself was sacked. The same fate befell Ryazan that made a turning point in open confrontation between Moscow and the Blue Horde.
In two consecutive battles in 1378 (Battle of the Vozha River) and 1380 (Battle of Kulikovo) Mamai was decisively defeated and Dmitry Ivanovich Donskoy strengthened his position as the Grand Prince of Vladimir.

External links 

 Historical Situation at the Time the Laurentian Codex was Written The National Library of Russia, 2012

Golden Horde
Conflicts in 1375
History of Nizhny Novgorod
14th century in the Grand Duchy of Moscow
1374 in Europe
1375 in Europe